Tolsti Vrh is a small settlement in the hills south of Vače in the Municipality of Litija in central Slovenia. The area is part of the traditional region of Upper Carniola and is now included with the rest of the municipality in the Central Sava Statistical Region.

History
Tolsti Vrh was a hamlet of Mala Sela until 1995, when it became a separate settlement.

References

External links
Tolsti Vrh on Geopedia

Populated places in the Municipality of Litija